Nicola Squitti was born on July, 26, 1853 in Maida, Catanzaro, Italy, died January 3, 1933. in Rome, Italy.

Senator Nicola Squitti was the brother of Baldassarre Squitti, and Eleanora Maria Squitti, children of Baron Tommaso Squitti, Baron of Palermiti and Guarna, Calabria, Italy. Tommaso Squitti, born September 8, 1831,  was married to Rosina Astanti.  Tommaso Squitti was invested with the title of Baron of Palermiti and Guarna, in Calabria, Italy, on July 13, 1886.

On January 23, 1887 Baron Squitti, under instructions from the State Department the Italian Consul at Philadelphia, conducted an inquiry into the death of Michael Fezano; an Italian  frozen to death in a lockup in the City of Carbondale, USA on Christmas Day. Fezano and four of his companions were arrested for drunkenness and placed in a lockup. All but Fezano secured release by paying heavy fines. He was left in all night and found the next night, frozen.  The case  created a great sensation, and a prosecution began against the Carbondale City authorities by the Iazzinf Society of Scranton.

During the 1890s he was the consul for all the Australasian Colonies.

Nicola Squitti was a member of the Italian Senate, and a diplomat.  He was the Italian foreign minister in Cetinje, 1908–1913, and at Belgrade, 1913-1916.

References 

Italian Senate

The Falcon and the Eagle - Montenegro and Austria-Hungary 1908-1914- John D. Treadway, University of Purdue, page 35

Senators of Italy Wikipedia-Italy

1853 births
Italian nobility
Italian politicians
1933 deaths